Fishtank Interactive was a German publishing label and was a division of Ravensburger Spieleverlag's Ravensburger Interactive. It was founded in 2000 to try to expand the horizons of Ravensburger Spieleverlag by publishing more mature games than the rest of the mostly pre-school oriented games of the company, without sullying its reputation. Its releases were usually action games, or real-time strategies, and were known for low production values highlighted by the lack of important features like multi-player playability. The division alongside its parent were sold in May 2002 to JoWooD Productions.

Releases
Fishtank Interactive released the following games for PC:

1914 - The Great War
AquaNox - also released for Xbox 
Archangel
Beam Breakers
Car Tycoon
Etherlords
Evil Islands: Curse of the Lost Soul
RIM: Battle Planets
S.W.I.N.E.

Defunct video game companies of Germany
Companies based in Baden-Württemberg